JD Natasha (born Natasha Jeannette Dueñas on February 27, 1988, in Kendall, Florida) is an American rock musician. She began her musical career as a solo singer-songwriter, singing and accompanying her music on the guitar. Later, she began to co-found other ensembles.

Early life
JD Natasha was born to an Argentine father and a Cuban American mother. She is the second of four children, sister of Jonathan Dueñas (Jae Coop), and grew up in Miami, Florida. She graduated from Coral Reef Senior High School. She started singing in her Church Choir at five and wrote her first song at 11.
Natasha credits a musical aunt of hers who introduced her to her primary influences in classic rock.

Career 
JD Natasha released her debut album Imperfecta-Imperfect on July 13, 2004, on the EMI International record label. The album, with tracks in both English and Spanish, exposed her to a new market of other Latin artists who have crossed over into the American market. She received acclaim as the best new Hispanic bilingual artist from Emilio Estefan as the "Top Pick in Emilio Estefan/People en Espanol’s 'Best of 2004'". In addition, she received praise from Newsday, The Miami Herald, Los Angeles Times, and the Associated Press.

In May 2008, Natasha formed the indie-rock act "Fancy Me Yet" with bandmates Alex Darren and Chris Bernard.

Despite JD Natasha's notable success early on in her musical career (including nominations for three Latin Grammys, "Best New Artist", "Best Rock Solo Album", and "Best Rock Song", while signed to EMI) you are hard pressed to find her new Los Angeles based rock outfit "The Second Howl" simply reminiscing on accolades of the past. Instead you discover a band eager to let the new music speak for itself, as it quickly rises above the noise. 
 
Natasha and guitarist Alex Darren met in their native city of Miami and began collaborating in 2008 after recognizing similar musical tastes. The duo formed "Fancy Me Yet," but in 2012 decided it was time for a fresh start and moved to Los Angeles. Upon arrival, they locked themselves in their Valley apartment and began writing furiously. 
 
The Second Howl has since finished a batch of "no apologies rock and roll" recordings with producer Eric Lilavois at Crown City Studios and are gearing up for upcoming live performances.

References

Further reading

External links
 

1988 births
American entertainers
American people of Argentine descent
American people of Cuban descent
Living people
Musicians from Miami
Rock en Español musicians
EMI Latin artists
People from Kendall, Florida
Women in Latin music